Metanomeuta is a genus of moths of the family Yponomeutidae.

Species
Metanomeuta fulvicrinis - Meyrick, 1935 
Metanomeuta zonoceros - Meyrick, 1935 

Yponomeutidae